Cellach I is traditionally said to have been the first Bishop of the Scots (fl. 878x889-906x), the bishopric later based at St. Andrews. He is mentioned in the historical writings of Walter Bower and Andrew of Wyntoun as a bishop of St. Andrews, but no pre-15th century sources say anything more than merely "Bishop". Wyntoun and Bower make him bishop as early as the reign of King Giric of Scotland (877x878-885x889). He was still bishop in the reign of King Causantín II of Scotland in 906 when, "in his sixth year King Causantín and Bishop Cellach met at the hill of belief near the royal city of Scone and pledged themselves that the laws and disciplines of the faith, and the laws of churches and gospels, should be kept in conformity with the customs of the Gaels". One interpretation  of this passage is the demise of the "Pictish church" to the reforming Gaels, however it is certain that by the 15th century the bishop-list of the principal Scottish see was looking back at Cellach as its first bishop. His death date is unknown, but unsurprisingly he was certainly dead by the 960s when his successor Fothad I died as bishop.

Notes

References
Anderson, Alan Orr (1922), Early Sources of Scottish History A.D. 500 to 1286, I (1990 revised & corrected ed.), Stamford: Paul Watkins, ISBN 1-871615-03-8
Broun, Dauvit, "Dunkeld and the origin of Scottish identity", in Innes Review 48 (1997), pp. 112–124, reprinted in Spes Scotorum: Hope of Scots, eds. Broun and Clancy (1999), pp. 95–111.
MacQueen, John, MacQueen, Winifred & Watt, D.E.R. (eds.), Scottichronicon by Walter Bower in Latin and English, Vol. 3, (Aberdeen, 1995)
Miller, Molly, "The Last Century of Pictish Succession", in Scottish Studies, 23, 1979, pp. 39–67

9th-century births
10th-century deaths
Bishops of St Andrews
Medieval Gaels from Scotland
9th-century Scottish bishops
10th-century Scottish bishops